Nizhnezaitovo (Tübänge Zäyet) is a rural locality (a selo) and the administrative centre of Nizhnezaitovsky Selsoviet, Sharansky District, Bashkortostan, Russia. The population was 690 as of 2010. There are 8 streets.

Geography 
Nizhnezaitovo is located 31 km west of Sharan (the district's administrative centre) by road. Chekan-Tamak is the nearest rural locality.

References 

Rural localities in Sharansky District